Will Gibbs (19 September 1885 – 29 January 1949) was a Barbadian cricketer. He played in eighteen first-class matches for the Barbados cricket team from 1907 to 1927.

See also
 List of Barbadian representative cricketers

References

External links
 

1885 births
1949 deaths
Barbadian cricketers
Barbados cricketers
Cricketers from Bridgetown